Valac is a demon described in the goetic grimoires The Lesser Key of Solomon (in some versions as Ualac or Valak and in Thomas Rudd's variant as Valu), Johann Weyer's Pseudomonarchia Daemonum (as Volac), the Liber Officiorum Spirituum (as Coolor or Doolas), and in the Munich Manual of Demonic Magic (as Volach) as an angelically winged boy riding a two-headed dragon, attributed with the power of finding treasures.

Variations 
The Lesser Key, the Munich Burnich, Rudd, and Weyer further agree in ranking Valac as a president and attributing him with the power to locate, summon, and control serpents. The Officium Spirituum similarly attributes Doolas with the power to give the summoner command of serpents as well as "household spirits," but it ranks Coolor and Doolas as princes instead of presidents.

Valac is listed 62nd in the Lesser Key (even by Rudd) and the 50th by Weyer, with either version claiming he leads 30 legions of demons (though some manuscripts say 38). The Munich Burnich describes Volach as controlling 27 legions of spirits. The Officium Spirituum (depending on the manuscript) ranks Coolor as either 21st (with no note of how many spirits he commands) or (in the copy found in the Folger Shakespeare Library) 22nd and commanding 13 legions of spirits. All extant and complete versions of the Officium Spirituum list Doolas as 25th demon, commanding 20 legions of spirits.

Rudd's version uniquely has Valac opposed by the Shemhamphorasch angel Iahhel.

A manuscript titled Fasciculus Rerum Geomanticarum lists him as Volach.

In popular culture 

 The 1998 film Vampires features a character named "Valek" as the first vampire.
 "Volac" appears in the Chilling Adventures of Sabrina comic book series. In issue #7, a young Edward Spellman, father of Sabrina Spellman, summons the demon at the request of Alphonse Louis Constant.
 "Ualac" appears in the Hellboy story "Box Full of Evil" as a major antagonist.
 The 2016 horror film The Conjuring 2 has "Valak" as the main antagonist, taking on the form of a demonic nun and The Crooked Man from the rhyme There Was a Crooked Man. However, the character bears no resemblance with myth besides the name. In the film's interpretation, the demon is associated with snakes, seeking human possession to escape its confinement within the Cartha monastery of Romania. The Nun would later have a cameo in the 2017 film Annabelle: Creation and receive its own spin-off film, The Nun, released on September 7, 2018, and The Nun 2 scheduled to be released on September 8, 2023.
 Valac appears as the fourth boss in the game Bloodstained: Curse of the Moon for the Nintendo Switch and PC. He is depicted as a two headed dragon that can fuse to make an even bigger dragon. He appears again in Bloodstained: Ritual of the Night.
 Valak appears also in the first season of Shadowhunters where it is summoned to retrieve Clary's memories back from it.
 The 2017 manga Welcome to Demon School! Iruma-kun has a main character named Clara Valac, a hyperactive demon girl who can make copies of anything she sees.

References

Bibliography

External links 

Valac's entry in the Lesser Key of Solomon, hosted at Twilit Grotto
Valac's entry in the Pseudomonarchia Daemonum, hosted at Twilit Grotto

Goetic demons
Female horror film villains